Orophia eariasella is a species of moth in the family Depressariidae. It was described by Francis Walker in 1864, and is known from South Africa.

References

Endemic moths of South Africa
Moths described in 1864
Orophia
Moths of Africa